Mohammad Mokhtari (September 10, 1989 – February 15, 2011) was an Iranian university student fatally wounded by a gunshot fired by the forces of the Islamic Regime on the February 14 2011 protests in Tehran. He died the next day, while hospitalized. Like Sane Jaleh, the regime tried to claim him as a Basiji, a member of the militia force of the regime always active in suppressing popular uprisings of the Iranian people.

Early life 
Mohammad reportedly "came from a large middle-class family, and loved sports". He was attending Azad University in Shahrood.

Killing and Subsequent Regime's Efforts to Hijack His Name
According to eyewitnesses, after Mr Mokhtari was shot, he briefly fell to the ground but got up and continued marching for a while as blood soaked his shirt. He died in the hospital the next day. 
On the eve of the first anniversary of his murder, his father did an interview, in which, he unveiled the efforts of the regime to brand Mohammad as a Basiji. During his funeral, they sent one of their agents to play the role of his mother for the camera and try to pretend Mohammad was a supporter of the regime. but later on, they found out about Mohammad's Facebook posts in which he invited his followers to rise against the regime.  Three days before his death, Mr Mokhtari wrote on his Facebook wall, "God, give me death by standing for it's better than a life of sitting under oppression."

Aftermath
On February 20 "thousands took to the streets of Iran's largest cities to commemorate the deaths" of the two protesters. According to Human Rights Watch, during a protest in the city of Shiraz at least one other student demonstrator was killed, Hamed Nour-Mohammadi. Nour-Mohammadi was "killed by security forces" while "trying to escape their attacks".

See also
 Sane Jaleh
 Neda Agha-Soltan
 Zahra Kazemi
 Zahra Bani Yaghoub
 Sohrab Arabi
 2011 Iranian protests

References

1989 births
2011 deaths
2011–2012 Iranian protests
Deaths by firearm in Iran
History of the Islamic Republic of Iran
Iranian democracy activists
Iranian dissidents
Protest-related deaths